Günther Hadank (20 October 1892, Berlin – 23 August 1973) was a German actor.

Filmography

Bibliography
 Willett, John. The Theatre of the Weimar Republic. Holmes & Meier, 1988.

External links

1892 births
1973 deaths
Male actors from Berlin
German male film actors
German male silent film actors
20th-century German male actors